Sherif Khalil  also written as Khalil Sherif (شريف خليل , born 18 August 1982) is an Egyptian male water polo player. He was a member of the Egypt men's national water polo team, playing as a driver. He was a part of the  team at the 2004 Summer Olympics. On club level he played for Heliopolis in Egypt.

References

1982 births
Living people
Egyptian male water polo players
Water polo players at the 2004 Summer Olympics
Olympic water polo players of Egypt
Place of birth missing (living people)
21st-century Egyptian people